Frankenstein is a 1973 American television movie adaptation of Mary Shelley's 1818 novel Frankenstein; or, The Modern Prometheus adapted by Sam Hall and Dark Shadows creator Dan Curtis, with Robert Foxworth in the title role and Bo Svenson as the Monster.

Cast
 Robert Foxworth as Dr. Victor Frankenstein
 Susan Strasberg as Elizabeth Lavenza
 Bo Svenson as The Monster
 Robert Gentry as Dr. Henry Clerval
 Heidi Vaughn as Agatha DeLacey
 Philip Bourneuf as Alphonse Frankenstein
 Robert Gentry as Henri Clerval
 Jon Lormer as Charles DeLacey
 William Hansen as Professor Waldman
 John Karlen as Otto Roget
 Willie Aames as William Frankenstein

Production
The Robert Cobert score was not original to this film. Cobert used musical cues from Dark Shadows and Dan Curtis' adaptation of The Strange Case of Dr. Jekyll and Mr. Hyde.

The film was shown over two nights on ABC's Wide World of Mystery. Part 1 of the film was shown on the same night, and on the same network, as another of Curtis' productions, The Night Strangler. The film was quickly overshadowed by the more lavishly budgeted Frankenstein: The True Story which premiered later that same year.

Reception
At the time of its release, the film garnered praise. Variety called the film "extraordinary entertainment." The Los Angeles Times said it was "quite a handsome show, with huge, foreboding sets and a splendid array of special effects." Radu Florescu's In Search of Frankenstein declared it "probably the most faithful rendering the screen has yet seen."

Modern reviews have been less effusive with CHUD.com saying "Ultimately, I can’t recommend Dan Curtis’ Frankenstein, but it was fun to watch....No, it's not good television and it doesn't make a good movie, but it's faithful to the text and reminds me of an era long gone." Comingsoon.net said of the film "As a whole, “Frankenstein” is an admirable accomplishment but it's also unmistakably a work of its time with its shot on video, stage-bound look lending it the feel of a situation comedy or SNL sketch."

See also
 List of films featuring Frankenstein's monster

References

Sources

External links
 
 

1973 television films
American horror television films
1970s science fiction horror films
Films based on horror novels
Frankenstein films
American science fiction television films
1973 horror films
Films set in Germany
American science fiction horror films
Films directed by Glenn Jordan